The rattail skate (Dipturus lanceorostratus) is a species of fish in the family Rajidae. It is endemic to Mozambique.  Its natural habitat is open seas.

References 

rattail skate
Endemic fauna of Mozambique
Fish of Mozambique
rattail skate
Taxonomy articles created by Polbot